Bloomingdale is a surname. Notable people with the surname include:

Al Bloomingdale (born 1953), American player of Canadian football
Alfred S. Bloomingdale (1916–1982), American businessman
Betsy Bloomingdale (born 1922), American socialite and philanthropist
Joseph B. Bloomingdale (1842–1904), American businessman
Lyman G. Bloomingdale (1841–1905), American businessman
Teresa Bloomingdale (1930-2000), American humorist and writer